Keith A. Reed (born October 8, 1978 in Yarmouth Port, Massachusetts) is an American former outfielder for the Baltimore Orioles of the Major League Baseball (MLB).

Reed was one of Baltimore's seven first-round draft picks in the 1999 Major League Baseball Draft. Reed played only 6 games with the Orioles, getting 1 hit in 5 at bats.

After the 2006 season, Reed signed with the Newark Bears of the independent Atlantic League. He batted .286 and set career-highs in home runs, RBI, stolen bases, hits, runs, and at-bats, Helping the team win the atlantic league championship over the Somerset Patriots that September. In , Reed had an even better season, hitting .295 with 26 home runs and 93 RBI. However, he has not played affiliated ball since.

References

External links
, or Retrosheet, or Pura Pelota (Venezuelan Winter League)

1978 births
Living people
Aberdeen IronBirds players
African-American baseball players
All-American college baseball players
American expatriate baseball players in Canada
Baltimore Orioles players
Baseball players from Massachusetts
Bluefield Orioles players
Bowie Baysox players
Delmarva Shorebirds players
Frederick Keys players
Major League Baseball outfielders
Newark Bears players
Ottawa Lynx players
People from Yarmouth, Massachusetts
Providence Friars baseball players
Rochester Red Wings players
Sportspeople from Barnstable County, Massachusetts
Tiburones de La Guaira players
American expatriate baseball players in Venezuela
21st-century African-American sportspeople
20th-century African-American sportspeople